Naatlo is a genus of ray spiders that was first described by Jonathan A. Coddington in 1986.

Behaviour
They use their web as a high speed slingshot to actively hunt for prey. Spiders in the genus have been observed to slingshot themselves at speeds exceeding 1.0m/s with accelerations exceeding 250m/s2.

Species
 it contains seven species, found in South America, Panama, Costa Rica, on Tobago, and Trinidad:
Naatlo fauna (Simon, 1897) – Costa Rica, Panama, Colombia, Venezuela, Trinidad and Tobago, Ecuador, Peru, Brazil
Naatlo maturaca Rodrigues & Lise, 2008 – Brazil
Naatlo mayzana Dupérré & Tapia, 2017 – Ecuador
Naatlo serrana Rodrigues & Lise, 2008 – Brazil
Naatlo splendida (Taczanowski, 1874) – Panama, Colombia, Venezuela, French Guiana, Ecuador, Peru, Bolivia, Brazil. [note, date wrong in several works as 1879]
Naatlo sutila Coddington, 1986 (type) – Panama, Colombia, Venezuela, Trinidad and Tobago, Suriname, Peru, Brazil, Argentina
Naatlo sylvicola (Hingston, 1932) – Venezuela, Trinidad and Tobago, Guyana

See also
 List of Theridiosomatidae species

References

Further reading

Araneomorphae genera
Spiders of Central America
Spiders of South America
Theridiosomatidae